A ramjet is an airbreathing jet engine that uses the engine's forward motion to compress incoming air.

Ramjet may also refer to:

 Ramjet (Transformers), a fictional character in the Transformers toyline
 Ramjet (Image Comics), a superhero and member of Dynamo 5
 Bussard ramjet, a theoretical form of spacecraft propulsion
 Rochester Ramjet,  an automotive fuel injection

See also
 Roger Ramjet, an animated television comedy
Nemo Ramjet, pen name of C. M. Kosemen, Turkish artist and author